Csaba Kovács (8 December 1932 – 27 January 2002) was a Hungarian rower. He competed at the 1952 Summer Olympics in Helsinki with the men's eight where they were eliminated in the semi-finals repêchage. He died on 27 January 2002 in Budapest.

References

1932 births
2002 deaths
Hungarian male rowers
Olympic rowers of Hungary
Rowers at the 1952 Summer Olympics
Rowers at the 1956 Summer Olympics
Rowers at the 1960 Summer Olympics
Rowers from Budapest
European Rowing Championships medalists